Jalan Dabong–Gua Musang (Kelantan state route D29) is a major road in Kelantan, Malaysia. The road connects Dabong in the north to Gua Musang in the south. It is a longest state road in Kelantan.

List of junctions

Roads in Kelantan